Beacon Hill, while ecumenically and administratively part of Hindhead, Surrey, is a discrete settlement with its own history, amenities and character. It lies in the southwest corner of Surrey on the A287 road between the towns of Haslemere and Farnham. The village began to be developed in the 19th century.

There are three churches, a primary school, a shopping area and a range of sporting facilities and activities in Beacon Hill.

Geography
Beacon Hill lies principally between two main roads to the north-west of Hindhead: the A287 Haslemere to Farnham road and the Tilford Road, an alternative and more rural route from Hindhead to Farnham via the village of Tilford. The nearest village to the north-west is Churt.

History
Beacon Hill is so-named because it was originally one of many beacon sites across England. The area began to be settled in the 19th century when people who could afford it built houses there to take advantage of the clean environment. John Tyndall declared the air to be as pure as that in the Swiss alps.

The Woodcock Inn served as Beacon Hill's only public house from the early 20th century until it closed in about 2008 and was subsequently demolished for housing.

Amenities

Worship

St Alban's Parish Church is a listed building, is part of the Joint Benefice of Churt (St John's) and Hindhead, in the Anglican Diocese of Guildford. The church building, replacing a temporary mission church built in 1904, was phased over a number of years, from 1907 (when Hindhead became a separate parish) to 1915.
St Anselm's Church serves the Roman Catholic congregation and is in the Catholic Parish of Haslemere, Hindhead and Chiddingfold. The church was established on its present site in the 1950s.
United Reformed Church (formerly Beacon Hill Congregational Church) was, in 1905, the first church to be built in Beacon Hill; it was built by London developer John Grover. Major refurbishment was carried out post-2005 to include meeting rooms and The Hub Coffee Bar incorporating computer, printing and wi-fi facilities.

Education

Beacon Hill Community Primary School is a secular school occupying two sites in the village with 208 pupils aged 4 to 11 in 2013.

Scouting
Hindhead Scouts and Guides for many years met in a hut in Cricket Close built in about 1923. In 2013 efforts were begun to raise funds for a new building with an estimated cost of £50,000.

Royal British Legion Club
Hindhead Royal British Legion Club has stood in Beacon Hill Road since the early 20th century, hosts numerous events throughout the year and has sport and leisure facilities including a floodlit tennis court, bowls, darts and snooker.

Marchants Hill
Marchants Hill camp, built in 1939 by the National Camps Corporation, was used in World War 2 to accommodate child evacuees from East Ham in London. The camp continued as a holiday and adventure venue for city children after the war and in 2015 is run by the activity holiday company PGL Ltd, on the  site.

Sport

The playing fields at Marchants Hill are home to Hindhead Athletic Football Club, Beacon Hill Junior Football Club and Hindhead Cricket Club. The cricket ground hosted two international women's cricket matches in the 1950s: Molly Hide's XI against Australia Women in 1951 and South Women Second XI against New Zealand Women in 1954.

Hindhead Golf Course and Club was established in 1904. One of its founders and first president was Sir Arthur Conan Doyle who lived at Hindhead at the time. Numerous notable people have been members over the years, including Peter Alliss who lived nearby.

Hindhead Tennis Club's home is at the Royal British Legion Club; the courts have floodlighting.

Shops and events
Shopping centre. The principal locality for shops is Beacon Hill Road.
Beacon Hill Beer Festival is held over 2 days in May at Hindhead Royal British Legion Club in Beacon Hill Road; 2013 was its 11th year.

References

External links

 Beacon Hill School
 Old Nostalgic Pictures of Beacon Hill

Villages in Surrey
Haslemere